Jeff Abraham is an American publicist, comedy historian and author. His book, The Show Won't Go On: The Most Shocking, Bizarre, and Historic Deaths of Performers Onstage, was written with Burt Kearns, and published on September 3, 2019, by Chicago Review Press.

Career
As a publicist, Abraham has represented many comedy projects and comedians, including George Carlin and David Brenner.  He has been a research consultant to authors and documentarians, and his Abraham Comedy Archives, a voluminous comedy album collection, has been a resource to writers and filmmakers alike. He is a prolific podcast and radio guest,    and in 2022, he was featured in the Emmy award-winning HBO documentary series,George Carlin's American Dream.

Abraham has conducted interviews for The Archive of American Television and worked closely with the Paley Center for Media. He is on the advisory board of the National Comedy Center.

As an author and comedy historian, he is completing the first authorized biography of The Ritz Brothers.

References

Year of birth missing (living people)
Living people
American male writers
American publicists
American consulting businesspeople
American comedy writers
21st-century American historians
21st-century American biographers